The knockout stage of the 2009 CAF Champions League was played from 4 October to 7 November 2009.

Bracket

Semi finals 
The first legs were scheduled for 4 October and the second legs for 17–18 October.

|}

Heartland won 5–0 on aggregate.

TP Mazembe won 5–4 on aggregate.

The Nigerian Football Federation requested the second leg of the Heartland – Kano Pillars semi final be rescheduled from 17 October due to preparations for the 2009 FIFA U-17 World Cup

Final 

|}

2–2 on aggregate. TP Mazembe won on the away goals rule.

References

External links
2009 CAF Champions League - todor66.com

Knockout stage